is a railway station on the Kagoshima Main Line operated by JR Kyushu in Okagaki, Fukuoka Prefecture, Japan.

Lines

Layout
The station consists of a side and an island platform serving three tracks. A passing loop designated as track 4 runs beyond track/platform 3 and a siding branches of it.

Adjacent stations

History
The station was opened by Japanese Government Railways on 6 February 1910 as an added station on the existing Kagoshima Main Line track. With the privatization of the successor Japanese National Railways, on 1 April 1987, JR Kyushu took over control of the station.

Passenger statistics
In fiscal 2016, the station was used by an average of 3,963 passengers daily (boarding passengers only), and it ranked 52nd among the busiest stations of JR Kyushu.

See also 
List of railway stations in Japan

References

External links
Ebitsu Station (JR Kyushu)

Railway stations in Fukuoka Prefecture
Railway stations in Japan opened in 1910